Missal of duke Novak (Croatian: Misal kneza Novaka) was a 14th-century Glagolitic missal. The letters of the missal were later used for the first Croatian printed book Missale Romanum Glagolitice.

Description

The missal itself was written in Croatian recension of the Church Slavonic language, in the Croatian angular Glagolitic script and quite possibly illuminated, by the royal knight Novak Disislavić on his estates in Krbava in 1368. The author's family descended from the Mogorović gentis, which at that time belonged to the medieval institution Nobiles duodecim generationum regni Croatiae. He was also named the duke of Šolgov in Hungary and duke of Nin in Dalmatia. The missal was written as a pledged gift to a church, where he was to be buried after death.

The last page (colophon) also contains written down verses in Chakavian by the author, a sequence of Christian mortality:

History
After Disislavić's death, the missal was not gifted to a church, but was kept by his sons. Ultimately, Novak Disislavić's son Petar, forced by financial trouble, sold it in 1405 for 45 ducats. The missal was then used by churches in Istria, where it remained for four centuries. In 1820, the missal was bought by Giovanni Battista Hettinger, an antiquarian, who brought it to Austria. Today, it is kept in the Austrian National Library in Vienna.

See also
 List of Glagolitic manuscripts

References

Bibliography
 
 

14th-century illuminated manuscripts
Illuminated missals
Croatian glagolithic texts
History of Lika
1368 works